Jhinjholi is a village situated in Saharanpur district of Uttar Pradesh state, north India. It is about 22 km from Saharanpur city.

Educational institutes

Schools 

 Primary School Jhinjholi
 Upper Primary School Jhinjholi 
 eVidyalam Education

References 

Villages in Saharanpur district